Nicole Lefrancois Clowney (born July 10, 1982) is an American politician from Arkansas. Since 2019, she has represented the 86th district in the Arkansas House of Representatives, which contains part of Fayetteville.

Political career

Election 
Clowney was elected unopposed in the general election on November 6, 2018. Her term began on January 14, 2019.

References 

Clowney, Nicole
Living people
21st-century American politicians
21st-century American women politicians
Women state legislators in Arkansas
1982 births